or  is a lake in the municipality of Hattfjelldal in Nordland county, Norway.  It is the headwaters of the river Vefsna.  The lake lies within Børgefjell National Park, just east of the municipal border with Grane.

See also
 List of lakes in Norway
 Geography of Norway

References

Lakes of Nordland
Hattfjelldal